Nawal El Moutawakel (Amazigh: ⵏⴰⵡⴰⵍ ⵍⵎⵓⵜⴰⵡⴰⵇⵇⵉⵍ ; ; born 15 April 1962) is a Moroccan former hurdler, who won the inaugural women's 400 metres hurdles event at the 1984 Summer Olympics, and was the first Moroccan to become an Olympic medalist (gold). In 2007, El Moutawakel was named the Minister of Sports in the upcoming cabinet of Morocco.

Life
El Moutawakel was born in Casablanca, and was studying at Iowa State University when she won her Olympic title, which came as a surprise in her home country. King Hassan II of Morocco telephoned her to give his congratulations, and he declared that all girls born the day of her victory were to be named in her honor. Her medal also meant the breakthrough for sporting women in Morocco and other mostly Muslim countries.

She was a pioneer for Muslim and African athletes in that she confounded long-held beliefs that women of such backgrounds could not succeed in athletics.

In 1993 she started running for fun, a 5 km run for women in Casablanca that has since become the biggest women's race held in a Muslim majority country, with up to 30,000 who came to run.

In 1995, El Moutawakel became a council member of the International Association of Athletics Federations (IAAF), now known as World Athletics, and in 1998 she became a member of the International Olympic Committee (IOC).

El Moutawakel is a member of the International Olympic Committee, and she was the president of the evaluation commissions for the selection of the host city for the Summer Olympics of 2012 and 2016. Since 2012 she is a vice-president of the IOC.

In 2006, El Moutawakel was one of the eight honored to bear the Olympic flag at the 2006 Winter Olympics Opening Ceremony in Turin, Italy. On 26 July 2012, she carried the London Olympics torch through Westminster.

El Moutawakel was one of the ambassadors of the Morocco 2026 FIFA World Cup bid.

International competitions

1Representing Africa

See also
Politics of Morocco
Sport in Morocco

References

External links

 
 

 
 

1962 births
Living people
Moroccan Muslims
Sportspeople from Casablanca
Moroccan sportsperson-politicians
Moroccan female hurdlers
Olympic athletes of Morocco
Olympic gold medalists for Morocco
Athletes (track and field) at the 1984 Summer Olympics
Medalists at the 1984 Summer Olympics
World Athletics Championships athletes for Morocco
International Olympic Committee members
Iowa State Cyclones women's track and field athletes
Government ministers of Morocco
National Rally of Independents politicians
Moroccan emigrants to the United States
Olympic gold medalists in athletics (track and field)
Mediterranean Games gold medalists for Morocco
Athletes (track and field) at the 1983 Mediterranean Games
Athletes (track and field) at the 1987 Mediterranean Games
Universiade medalists in athletics (track and field)
Women government ministers of Morocco
Mediterranean Games medalists in athletics
Universiade gold medalists for Morocco
Universiade bronze medalists for Morocco
Competitors at the 1983 Summer Universiade
Medalists at the 1985 Summer Universiade
Medalists at the 1987 Summer Universiade
African Championships in Athletics winners
21st-century Moroccan women politicians
21st-century Moroccan politicians